Gerardo Castañeda (8 December 1925 – 28 September 1989) was a Guatemalan former sports shooter. He competed in the 50 metre pistol event at the 1968 Summer Olympics.  He also served as an army colonel.

References

1925 births
1989 deaths
Guatemalan male sport shooters
Olympic shooters of Guatemala
Shooters at the 1968 Summer Olympics
People from Santa Rosa Department, Guatemala